The following lists events that happened during 2014 in Malawi.

Incumbents
 President: Joyce Banda (until May 31), Peter Mutharika (starting May 31)
 Vice-President: Khumbo Kachali (until May 31), Saulos Chilima (starting May 31)

Events

May
 May 20 - Voters in Malawi go to the polls for a general election.
 May 24 - The President of Malawi Joyce Banda annuls the general elections in which she was a candidate because of claimed electoral irregularities.

References

 
2010s in Malawi
Years of the 21st century in Malawi
Malawi
Malawi